Palnati Yuddham may refer to:

 Palnati Yuddham (1947 film), a 1947 Telugu historical film
 Palnati Yuddham (1966 film), a 1966 historical film